La Pallu is a commune in the Mayenne department in northwestern France.

See also
Communes of Mayenne
Parc naturel régional Normandie-Maine

References

Pallu